Geraldine Moodie (31 October 1854 – 4 October 1945) was a Canadian photographer who pioneered in capturing photos of early Canadian history. She is best known for her work with indigenous peoples in Northern Canada. Moodie is one of Canada's first professional female photographers. She opened photography studios in Battleford, Saskatchewan (1891), Maple Creek (1897), and Medicine Hat, Alberta (1897).

Biography 
Géraldine Fitzgibbon was born in Toronto, Ontario, Canada (which was Canada West at the time) on 31 October 1854 to Agnes and Charles Fitzgibbon. Geraldine was the granddaughter of author, Susanna Strickland Moodie. She was distantly related to Catherine Parr Trail. Geraldine married John Douglas Moodie in England in 1878, he was a distant relative to her.

The newly married couple returned to Canada, first moving to western Canada, and they briefly farmed in Manitoba, then moved to Ottawa. In 1885, her husband received a commission with the North-West Mounted Police (NWMP). The Moodie, together they had six children.

Living in rural Canada at the turn of the twentieth century, she found herself living in a world of male dominance and a lack of women with notable social status. Despite this adversity, she was far more successful and influential than her metropolitan counterparts.

Career

In addition to portraits, she took images of the mounted police, ranching and wildflowers. She frequently accompanied her husband, John Douglas Moodie, on his travels, photographing the Innu people in the area of Hudson Bay (1904–1909). She also took photographs around the city of Regina (1910–1911). Many of her photographs were in connection with her husband's work on the Canadian Pacific Railway, accompanying his reports to Prime Minister Wilfrid Laurier and CPR officials.

In her writings, she mentions needing to modify her techniques because of the glare of the snow and the harsh weather.

Her work was part of a 2017 exhibition, See North of Ordinary, The Arctic Photographs of Geraldine and Douglas Moodie, at the Glenbow Museum.

Legacy 
Moodie died in 1945 at the age of 90, she was buried in Burnsland Cemetery in Calgary, Alberta, Canada. Moodie's photographs are in museum permanent collections including, Glenbow Museum in Alberta, Canada; the British Museum in London, England; and others.

A stamp depicting Moodie's photograph, Koo-tuck-tuck, was issued on 22 March 2013 by Canada Post as part of their Canadian Photography series. The image shows a traditionally dressed Inuit woman.

Publications

See also 

 Edward S. Curtis, American photographer whose work focused on the American West and on Native American peoples
 Felipe Lettersten, sculptor who cast sculptures of indigenous people
 Photography by indigenous peoples of the Americas
 Salvage ethnography

References

External links
Geraldine Moodie on Find a Grave

1854 births
1945 deaths
Pioneers of photography
Canadian portrait photographers
Canadian women photographers